The Avia 40-P was intended as an economical glider suitable for clubs and individuals  but with a competitive performance capable of record setting. It was the most popular pre-war French glider, with more than forty built and it continued to set records immediately after World War II.

Design and development

Avia's national record setting  span Avia 41-P, first flown in 1933 was very effective in the hands of an experienced pilot but its cost limited its sales. The result was the Avia 40-P, first flown (despite the number) in 1935. It became the best-selling French glider in the late pre-war period, with over forty produced.

The 40-P was similar in layout and construction to its larger forebear.  Though the smaller span reduced the aspect ratio from 19.4 to 14.5, increasing the induced drag, it allowed a reduction of profile drag by the introduction of a cantilever wing without bracing struts. The wings of the Avia 40-P had unbroken straight taper in plan, lacked the strong camber of the 41-P's centre section, and were built around plywood leading edge torsion box spars.  Behind the spars the wings were fabric covered apart from the long span ailerons, which filled about two thirds of the trailing edges. New wing features were the upper surface spoilers, mounted on the rear of the box spar just inboard of the ailerons.

The wings were mounted on a low fuselage pylon, with the open cockpit immediately ahead of it. The 40-P's fuselage was oval in cross-section, tapering to the tail and entirely ply covered. There was a landing skid under the forward fuselage and the wing aided, by a tail bumper. As on the 41-P, the ply covered fixed fin and tailplane were very narrow, with generous, fabric covered control surfaces. Its tailplane was mounted on top of the fuselage and far enough forward that only a shallow reduction in elevator chord near the root was needed for movement of the rudder, which extended to the fuselage keel.

The 40-P flew for the first time on 3 May 1935, piloted by Eric Nessler. At least forty were built, including ten in the then French colony of Algeria; one source puts the total at 125. Production of the Avia 40-P continued into World War II, despite the occupation of France. At its end, new women's national records were again established with the 40-P, notably the straight line distance record of  set by Marcelle Choisnet in June 1944 and the duration record of 16 hrs 44 mins by Suzanne Melk in October 1946.

The number that survived the war is also uncertain but it is known that three of the fourteen taken to Germany and used to train Hitler Youth pilots were recovered by British troops. One at least was returned to the United Kingdom and flew there until the 1970s.  Restored in the 1990s, its owner moved to France and flew it at Saint-Aubin, Lot-et-Garonne. It remains airworthy, though it only flies rarely, and is on display at the Musée Régional de l'Air at Angers – Loire Airport. Another 40-P, which is not airworthy, is on display at the Musée de l'Air et de l'Espace.

Specifications

References

1930s French sailplanes
Ateliers vosgiens d'industrie aéronautique (Avia) aircraft
Glider aircraft
Aircraft first flown in 1935